= Amy Scherber =

American baker

Amy Scherber is an American baker. She is the founder of Amy's Bread, a bakery in New York City.

Scherber grew up in Minneapolis. She received an undergraduate degree in economics and psychology from St. Olaf College.

Scherber was nominated for the James Beard Award for Outstanding Pastry Chef in 1997 and 2001.

== Books ==
- with Toy Dupree Amy's Bread, Revised and Updated: Artisan-style breads, sandwiches, pizzas, and more from New York City's favorite bakery (2010)
- with Toy Dupree The Sweeter Side of Amy's Bread (2008)
- with Toy Dupree Amy's Bread (1996)
